The Bay Village City School District is a public school district that serves Bay Village, Ohio.

Schools
Bay High School
Bay Middle School
Westerly Elementary School
Normandy School
Glenview Center for Childcare & Learning

References

External links

School districts in Cuyahoga County, Ohio
Bay Village, Ohio